The Rainbow Ethiopia: Movement for Democracy and Social Justice is a political party in Ethiopia. It was founded by Professor Mesfin Woldemariam. At the last legislative elections which were held on 15 May 2005, the party was part of the Coalition for Unity and Democracy that won 109 out of 527 seats in the Council of People's Representatives.
Founding chairman is Berhanu Nega.

Political parties in Ethiopia